Poshteh-ye Mazaj (also Romanized as Poshteh-ye Māzaj) is a village in Hur Rural District, in the Central District of Faryab County, Kerman Province, Iran. At the 2006 census, its population was 73, in 17 families.

References 

Populated places in Faryab County